A coupe SUV is a type of sport utility vehicle with a sloping rear roofline similar to those of fastbacks or Kammbacks. The sloping roofline is adopted to offer a styling advantage compared to its standard SUV counterpart, which helps increase profit margins as manufacturers are able to raise the price by marketing it as a more premium model. Since all coupe SUVs ever produced are of the crossover variety, coupe SUVs may also be called "coupe crossovers" or "coupe crossover SUVs".  

Although the term "coupe" itself is supposed to refer to a passenger car with a sloping or truncated rear roofline and two (or three) doors, traditional two-door SUVs (including body-on-frame SUVs) such as certain models of Toyota RAV4 and Jeep Wrangler are never considered by such terms, and every coupe SUV by definition (except for the Range Rover Evoque Coupé) is equipped with five doors. The body style notably gained criticism as some see it as less attractive and less practical than normal crossovers, since the low roofline reduces cargo space and rear passenger headroom.

History 

The BMW X6 is generally considered the first coupe SUV. It was based on the BMW X5 and has been marketed as a "Sports Activity Coupé" (SAC), as opposed to standard BMW crossovers, which are called "Sports Activity Vehicles" (SAVs). Introduced in 2008, the X6's styling generated some controversy upon its introduction, as it had less cargo space and a higher price.  Mercedes-Benz followed suit in 2015 with the GLE-Class Coupe, while Audi released the Q8 in 2018.

The AMC Eagle SX/4, which was introduced in 1981, has also been argued to be the first coupe SUV, since it is a lifted two-door liftback with a permanent all-wheel drive system and was marketed as a car that is capable of light-duty off-roading. The second-generation Lexus RX and the 2003 Infiniti FX had introduced similar sloping roof design elements without being marketed as coupe SUVs.

Due to its roots from the BMW X6, the segment in its early days mostly consisted of vehicles in the luxury segment. Audi released the coupe version of their Q5 crossover with the "Sportback" moniker, while Mercedes-Benz uses the "Coupé" designation, both in line with their two-door and four-door coupes or fastbacks. Several manufacturers began offering coupe crossovers from non-luxury segments, for example the Renault Arkana, and some China-only models such as the Mazda CX-4, Volkswagen Tiguan X and Škoda Kodiaq GT.

Some crossovers may feature similar fastback roof sloping, but are not explicitly marketed as coupe SUVs. Examples are the Tesla Model X and Model Y, Toyota C-HR, Nissan Ariya, and Volvo C40.

Marketing 
According to Strategic Vision, an automotive research and consulting company, buyers of coupe SUVs—particularly those from Mercedes-Benz—are four to five years younger than the usual buyers of typical SUVs. This decreases a car brand's average age, which in turn increases the brand's desirability. They also noted that buyers of SUV coupes are less price-sensitive, which means brands can increase the price tag on these vehicles without affecting sales.

Criticism 
The coupe SUV category has attracted criticism due to being more expensive than its traditional SUV counterpart, despite having reduced cargo space and rear passenger headroom due to their lower rear roof. Like other crossover SUVs, coupe SUVs also offers poorer performance than their coupe/sedan/wagon equivalent due to additional weight and ride height. Kristen Lee from Jalopnik argued that coupe SUVs "aren’t are [sic] particularly good at any one thing," Other criticisms arise from the fact that coupe SUV contradicts the traditional concept of a coupe which should only have two doors, frameless doors, and 2+2 seating.

Since its introduction, the exterior design of the BMW X6 has been widely regarded as controversial, as the rear design in particular was said to make the car look "heavy". The first-generation Acura ZDX has received a negative reception from critics and was not a sales success.

Gallery

See also 

 Kammback
 Fastback
 Toyota RSC, a concept SUV with a coupe-like roofline and two doors

References 

Coupe
Car body styles